Sue-meg State Park (formerly Patrick's Point State Park) is a  in Humboldt County, California near Trinidad on the Redwood Coast, situated on a lushly forested promontory above the Pacific Ocean.   

The park is home to many tree species including coastal redwoods, Sitka spruce, western hemlock, pine, grand fir, Douglas fir, red alder and wildflower meadows, with a shoreline that consists of sandy beaches and sheer cliffs against the Pacific Ocean. 

Amenities include hiking trails, a recreated Yurok Village, a native plant garden, visitor center, three family campgrounds, two group camps, a camp for hikers and bicyclists, accessible beaches, lookout points, and three group picnic areas.

History 
Sue-meg is the original place name used by the Yurok people. In the modern Yurok orthography, it is spelled Suemeeg, pronounced [ʂumiɣ] or [ʂumij].

Patrick Beegan, an Irish immigrant who came from the Mississippi Valley in 1851, referred to the area as Patrick's Ranch. After encountering wild potato, "Old Patrick," as he was known to the residents of the Trinidad area, decided to stop and file a preemption claim to the land.  Beegan's claim to the land was first recorded in the Trinidad Record Book on January 13, 1851, and the first official mention of Patrick's Point on the Humboldt County map was in 1886.  

Later, requests that the park be renamed because Patrick Beegan had been accused of murdering several Indigenous Americans led to a name change. Sue-meg, reflecting the original Yurok name for the land, became official by unanimous vote of the California State Parks and Recreation Commission in 2021.

See also
List of beaches in California
List of California state parks

References

External links

California State Parks page
North Coast Redwood Interpretive Association

California State Reserves
California State Beaches
State parks of California
Parks in Humboldt County, California
Beaches of Humboldt County, California
Beaches of Northern California